is a village located in Tokachi Subprefecture, Hokkaido, Japan.

As of September 2016, the village has an estimated population of 3,275. The total area is 176.45 km2.

Climate

Mascot

He is an acorn. His goal is to have the town develop like a tree.

References

External links

Official Website 

Villages in Hokkaido